Weedley Tunnel at  is a disused tunnel on the former Hull and Barnsley Railway. It was originally built to carry two tracks. Access to the tunnel is now restricted, as gates were installed on both portals in 2010. The tunnel is cut through chalk and brick lined throughout and is in relatively good condition when compared to Sugar Loaf Tunnel further east and the much longer Drewton Tunnel.

Weedley Tunnel is now used as an access route for the Drewton Estate.

References

External links

Railway tunnels in England
Hull and Barnsley Railway
Tunnels in the East Riding of Yorkshire